ITA Award for Best Actor Popular is an award given by the Indian Television Academy as a part of its annual event to the male actor who receives the highest votes by the public. First awarded in 2001, the award was originally named Desh Ka Sitara but was later renamed to Best Actor Popular.

Winners and nominees

2000s

2010s

2020s

See also
 ITA Award for Best Actress Popular
 ITA Award for Best Show Popular

References

External links
 Indian Television Academy Awards

TV awards for lead actor
Awards established in 2001
Actor